The Hunters (translit. Oi kynigoi) is a 1977 Greek dramatic art film directed by Theodoros Angelopoulos. It was entered into the 1977 Cannes Film Festival.

Cast
 Mary Chronopoulou
 Eva Kotamanidou
 Aliki Georgouli
 Vangelis Kazan as Hotelier
 Betty Valassi
 Giorgos Danis as Industrialist
 Stratos Pahis as Constructor
 Christoforos Nezer as Politician
 Dimitris Kaberidis
 Takis Doukakos
 Nikos Kouros as Militarist

References

External links

1977 drama films
1977 films
Films directed by Theodoros Angelopoulos
Films shot in Epirus
Greek drama films
Films set in Greece
1970s Greek-language films